Tatyana Georgyevna Konyukhova (born November 12, 1931, Tashkent, Uzbek SSR, USSR) is a Soviet actress. People's Artist of the RSFSR (1991). Member of the CPSU since 1967.

Biography 
Tatyana Konyukhova was born in November 12, 1931 in Tashkent (Uzbek SSR). Her father hails from Ladyzhenki at Poltava and her mother was from Zolochiv in Kharkiv. Her grandfather was an agronomist at the estate Tereshchenko, this is a very large sugar producer.

In 1946, her father was sent to work in Latvia, and the family moved to Riga. School In 1949 he came to Moscow and entered VGIK (workshop Boris Bibikov and Olga Pyzhova).

As a second-year student, she made her debut in cinema in the film by Alexander Rou May Night, or the Drowned Maiden. In 1955, she graduated from University and worked briefly in Maly Theatre. In the years 1956-1992 she was an actress of film actor Theatre-studio. 

Since 1964, Konyukhova has been a member of the Committee of the Lenin Prize in literature and art.  Since 1969 she has been a member of the Central Committee of Trade Union of workers of culture.

Selected filmography 
1951 —  Sporting Honour
1952 —  May Nights, or the Drowned
 1953 —  Marina's Destiny
 1955 — The Boys from Leningrad
1955 —  Volnitsa
1955 —  Good Morning
1956 —  Different Fates
1957 — An Unusual Summer
1958 —  Over Tissa
1958 —  Oleko Dundich
1961 —  Dima Gorin's Career
1962 —   Beat the Drum!
1964 —  Balzaminov's Marriage
1964 —  Executions at Dawn
1967 —  The Red and the White
1968 —  The Mysterious Monk
1972 —  Nights Chronicle
1979 —  Moscow Does Not Believe in Tears
1981 —  A Painter's Wife Portrait
1986 —  On the Porch Sat With Gold
1990 —  All Ahead
1995 —  Pacific Angel Flying
2008 —  Three with Carronade Square
2011 —  Stored Fate

Family 
 Her first husband —  a student of film studies faculty of VGIK Valeri Karen (later —  editor association Mosfilm).
 The second husband —  a sound engineer Boris Vengerovsky.
 The third husband —  a 4-time champion of the USSR (1953, 1954, 1958, 1961), the javelin thrower, the doctor of pedagogical sciences, Vladimir Kuznetsov.
 Son —  Sergey Kuznetsov, the Foreign Ministry employee.
 Granddaughter —  Olga, engaged in synchronized swimming.

References

External links
 
 Татьяна Конюхова. Биография
 Татьяна Конюхова. Фотоальбом

1931 births
Living people
Soviet film actresses
Soviet stage actresses
Russian film actresses
Russian stage actresses
Russian television actresses
Actresses from Moscow
20th-century Russian actresses
21st-century Russian actresses
Honored Artists of the RSFSR
People's Artists of the RSFSR
Gerasimov Institute of Cinematography alumni
Communist Party of the Soviet Union members
Uzbekistani people of Ukrainian descent